Donald Mohler is an American politician from Maryland and a member of the Democratic Party. He served as the 13th Baltimore County Executive.

County Executive
Donald Mohler was appointed by the Baltimore County Council on May 29, 2018, as County Executive to replace the recently deceased Kevin B. Kamenetz. He had previously served as the Chief of Staff and Communications Director to County Executives Kevin B. Kamenetz and James T. Smith.

References

Living people
Year of birth missing (living people)
Place of birth missing (living people)
Maryland Democrats
Politicians from Baltimore
Baltimore County Executives